This is a list of Barbadian women Twenty20 International cricketers. A Twenty20 International is an international cricket match between two representative teams, each having Twenty20 International status, as determined by the International Cricket Council (ICC). A Twenty20 International is played under the rules of Twenty20 cricket.

This list includes all players who have played at least one T20I match for Barbados and is initially arranged in the order of debut appearance. Where more than one player won their first cap in the same match, those players are initially listed alphabetically at the time of debut.

Barbados women's team played their first match against Pakistan on 29 July 2022 during 2022 Commonwealth Games. As the West Indies qualified as a direct qualifier, the results of a separate tournament were originally going to be used to determine which Commonwealth Games Association (CGA) earned qualification. However when the tournament was cancelled due to COVID-19, Barbados were selected to represent the West Indies, by virtue of being the Twenty20 Blaze defending champions.

Key

List of Players
Status updated as of 3 August 2022.

Notes

References

Barbados